Sum Nung or Cen Neng (岑能) was a Peruvian-Chinese martial artist. He was a Grandmaster of the Wing Chun style and the only disciple of martial artist Yuen Kay Shan. At the age of 18, he became famous in Foshan, and is now considered the father of Wing Chun of Guangzhou.

Early years
Sum Nung was born in Peru in 1926. He was of a Chinese father and a Peruvian mother. When he was about 7 years of age, he traveled to China with the father to visit his grandmother. During his visit, Japan attacked China during the Second World War. The Japanese bombarded their house and his father died, he was then left alone with the grandmother. Communication between the outside as well as within China was terminated. Master Sum lost contact with his mother and his wealthy life, to live poorly as many during the war. When he was about 12 years of age, he was entrusted to work as an apprentice in the restaurant "Sky and Sea'' in the state of Foshan. He had a hard time there since he was often beaten up and humiliated because he was half Chinese and half Peruvian. They made fun of him because of his sharp-pointed and big nose.

Career as a martial artist
The chef of the restaurant called Cheung Bo was a master of Wing Chun Kung Fu and began teaching him how to defend himself against his assailants. In 1941, the famous Yuen Kay Shan owner of great properties in that state and winner of many death fights/combats, was introduced to Sum Nung. Looking at the master's slim and low physique, Sum doubted his talent and responded that he had nothing to learn from him. Yuen Kay Shan demonstrated and gave him a slight beating, another version was that Yuen placed a raw egg in each of his 2 pockets and challenged Sum to break an egg while he stood in the middle of a circle on the ground, Sum could not break an egg or even push Yuen out of the circle after this Sum was convinced that he could learn a lot from him and became his disciple. Sum Nung developed a great reputation toward the quality of his Kung Fu, he often had to fight to defend himself against the discrimination for being a foreigner. In 1943 he began teaching in Foshan in the village's deep temple to students like Sum Jee. In the late 1940s, he moved to the city of Guangzhou, where he taught Wing Chun to members of several local trade unions. In 1947, he was a professor of Wing Chun in the Guangzhou union machinery. The following year, he opened a natural (herbal) or traditional medicine clinic and was a Chinese doctor at Daisun Street and also ran a martial arts school.

Philosophy
Nung's hobby was bird fighting and he said he would not feed birds that were not good at fighting, a philosophy that influenced the choice of his students, for example Felix Leong. Nung received Felix as a talented student, Because he was already a master of Wing Ching under the prestigious master Lai Chi Wa and he won the title of Australian National Martial arts champion in 1977, the following year he fought in New Zealand and ended up as champion of South Pacific.

In popular culture
The 2016 film Ip Man 3 martial arts film directed by Wilson Yip, and produced by Raymond Wong Pak-ming, which was the third in the series of films based on the life of Ip Man, Grandmaster of Wing Chun, with Donnie Yen in the lead role, also featuring Mike Tyson and Bruce Lee, one of Ip's students, played by Danny Chan Kwok-kwan.

The actor Zhang Jin was cast in the supposed role of Sum Nung, who was also an expert in Wing Chun and an able opponent of Ip Man in complex battles. However, due to Sum Nung being a disciple of Yuen Kay Shan, the name Sum Nung was changed to Cheung Tin-chi to avoid conflicts with Yuen Kay Shan's lineage and descendants, which was previously erupted in a controversy of Yuen Kay Shan being shown at a lower level than Ip Man in the 2010 film The Legend Is Born: Ip Man.

References

1926 births
2002 deaths
Chinese Wing Chun practitioners
Peruvian Wing Chun practitioners
Peruvian emigrants to China